The 2009–10 Ghanaian Premier League (known as the Glo Premier League for sponsorship reasons) season was the 51st season of top-tier football in Ghana. The competition began on 18 October 2009, and ended on 12 May 2010.
Aduana Stars won the league for the first time in the club's history.

League table

References 

Ghana Premier League seasons
2009–10 in African association football leagues
2009–10 in Ghanaian football